The men's triple jump event at the 2015 African Games was held on 14 September.

Results

References

Triple
2015